Armchair 30 is an anthology drama series of short plays produced by Thames Television and broadcast in 1973.  The series was a spin-off from Armchair Theatre.

Episodes

References

1970s British drama television series
1970s British anthology television series
1973 British television series debuts
1973 British television series endings